Katrina Roen is a New Zealand psychology / sociology academic, and as of 2019 is a full professor at the University of Waikato. She was formerly a visiting researcher at the University of Oslo.

Academic career

After a 1998  PhD titled  'Constructing transsexuality: Discursive manoeuvres through psycho-medical, transgender, and queer texts'  at the University of Canterbury, Roen took up a series of academic posts in Wellington, Lancaster, and then Oslo where she became a visiting researcher.

Selected works 
 Popay, Jennie, Helen Roberts, Amanda Sowden, Mark Petticrew, Lisa Arai, Mark Rodgers, Nicky Britten, Katrina Roen, and Steven Duffy. "Guidance on the conduct of narrative synthesis in systematic reviews." A product from the ESRC methods programme Version 1 (2006): b92.
 Roen, Katrina. "" Either/Or" and" Both/Neither": Discursive Tensions in Transgender Politics—TEST." Signs: Journal of Women in Culture and Society 27, no. 2 (2002): 501-522.
 McDermott, Elizabeth, Katrina Roen, and Jonathan Scourfield. "Avoiding shame: Young LGBT people, homophobia and self‐destructive behaviours." Culture, Health & Sexuality 10, no. 8 (2008): 815–829.
 Scourfield, Jonathan, Katrina Roen, and Liz McDermott. "Lesbian, gay, bisexual and transgender young people's experiences of distress: resilience, ambivalence and self‐destructive behaviour." Health & social care in the community 16, no. 3 (2008): 329–336.
 Roen, Katrina. "Transgender theory and embodiment: The risk of racial marginalisation." Journal of Gender Studies 10, no. 3 (2001): 253–263.

References

External links
 

Living people
Academic staff of the University of Waikato
New Zealand women academics
Year of birth missing (living people)
University of Canterbury alumni